Maganbhai Ranchhodbhai Patel was an Indian bureaucrat, known for his contributions to the cooperative sector in India. He was also known for introducing reforms in the land sector for the benefit of the farmers. He was involved with many cooperative institutions and banks such as Sardargunj Mercantile Co-operative Bank and Kalupur Bank. He was honoured by the Government of India in 1967, with the award of Padma Shri, the fourth highest Indian civilian award for his contributions to the society.

See also

 Cooperative

References

Recipients of the Padma Shri in science & engineering
Year of birth missing
Indian government officials
Indian cooperative organizers